An immigrant is a person who legally moves to another country.

Immigrant(s), The Immigrant(s), or variants may also refer to:

Film and television
 The Immigrant (1915 film), a feature film produced by Jesse Lasky
 The Immigrant (1917 film), a comedy short written and directed by Charles Chaplin
 Immigrants (1948 film), an Italian drama film
 The Immigrant (1990 film), an Iranian film directed by Ebrahim Hatamikia
 Immigrants (2008 film), a Hungarian film
 The Immigrant (2013 film), an American drama film written and directed by James Gray
 Immigrant (TV series), an upcoming American drama streaming television miniseries

Music
 The Immigrant: A New American Musical, a musical based on a play by Mark Harelik
 "Immigrant Song", a 1970 song by Led Zeppelin
 "The Immigrant" (Neil Sedaka song), a 1975 song by Neil Sedaka
 "Immigrants (We Get the Job Done)", a 2016 song by K'naan, Snow Tha Product, Riz MC, and Residente, based on the musical Hamilton
 Immigrant (album), a 2018 album by Belly

Other uses
 HaOlim (The Immigrants), a defunct political party in Israel
 The Immigrants, a 1977 novel by Howard Fast

See also
 Migrant (disambiguation)
 The Emigrants (disambiguation)
 Immigration